The first season of the Greek Cypriot reality talent show The Voice of Greece premiered on January 10, 2014, on ANT1. Based on the reality singing competition The Voice of Holland, the series was created by Dutch television producer John de Mol. It is part of an international series.

The show is hosted by Giorgos Liagkas with Themis Georgantas serving as the backstage and social networking corresponding. The lead vocalist of the band Stavento, Michalis Kouinelis, Despina Vandi, Antonis Remos and Melina Aslanidou are the coaches of the season. The winner receives a record deal with Minos EMI.

Auditions, coaches and hosts 
The first trailer for the season came out on September 13, 2013, which officially opened the submissions for the auditions. The auditions started on September 30, 2013, and were held in Greece and Cyprus.

Several artists were rumored to be part of the judging panel once ANT1 announced the show. Anna Vissi and Vandi were the first to be rumored as they are two of the biggest singers in both Cyprus and Greece. After being a judge on Dancing on Ice, Elena Paparizou was in the running for the judging panel. On the running were also Marinella, Remos and Nikos Karvelas. Remos and Vandi were the first to be confirmed as coaches followed by Kouinelis from Stavento and Aslanidou. Teasers from each coach talking about the show were shown on January 5, 2014, just five days before the premiere.

Natalia Germanou was unofficially confirmed to be the host of the show. However, it was later revealed that she had a proposition for the judging panel which was later turned down by the broadcaster after it was decided that the judges will be only professional singers. A few days after the unofficial confirmation, Sakis Rouvas, who also hosted the Greek version of The X Factor, was rumored to be the host of the show. On December 5, 2013, the broadcaster revealed that Liagkas will be hosting the show with Georgantas being the V reporter.

Promotion 
The first trailer premiered in September 2013 announcing the season and explaining how to participate. Four short trailers were broadcast in early-December, teasing the show and its format. A few weeks before the premiere of the season, a trailer which featured the coaches going to the stage from backstage and a singer auditioning. All the four coaches hit their buttons, with Vandi and Remos being the first two followed by Kouinellis and Aslanidou the same time. The premiere date was announced on the second version of the same changed trailer. Along with that trailer four short trailers were shown with each coach talking about the show and their expectations.

The trailer for the battles was shown when the blind auditions where over, on February 24, 2014. It featured two singers going to the stage–ring, shooting each other with their microphones.

Teams
Each coach of the season had, after the blind auditions, sixteen acts in his team. During the battles each coach lost half of his acts. During the live shows, the coaches were losing two (first and second live) or one act (third to fifth live) until the final live where each coach had one act.
Color key

Blind auditions 
The blind auditions took place in the Kapa Studios in Spata, Attica. Each coach had the length of the artists' performance to decide if they wanted that artist on their team. If two or more coaches have wanted the same artist, then the artist chose their coach. If only one wanted the artist, then the artist was defaulted in his team. Once the coaches picked their team, they pitted them against each other in the Battles.

The blind auditions episodes were aired on Fridays since January 10, 2014 until February 21, 2014 with the last blind audition being aired on Sunday, February 23, 2014.

Color key

Episode 1 (January 10) 
The first blind audition episode was broadcast on January 10, 2014.

 Group performance: The Voice of Greece coaches – Medley of "Me Mia Agalia Tragoudia", "Den Eho Diefthinsi", "Iparhi Zoi", "Ine Stigmes", "Pidao Ta Kimata"

Episode 2 (January 17) 
The second blind audition episode was broadcast on January 17, 2014.

Episode 3 (January 24) 
The third blind audition episode was broadcast on January 24, 2014.

Episode 4 (January 31) 
The fourth blind audition episode was broadcast on January 31, 2014.

Episode 5 (February 7) 
The fifth blind audition episode was broadcast on February 7, 2014.

Episode 6 (February 14) 
The sixth blind audition episode was broadcast on February 14, 2014.

Episode 7 (February 21) 
The seventh blind audition episode was broadcast on February 21, 2014.

Episode 8 (February 23) 
The eighth and last blind audition episode was broadcast on February 23, 2014.

The Battles 
The Battles took place in the Kapa Studios in Spata, Attica. Two artists from each team compete against by singing the same song. The coach of the two acts decides which one will go through and which one will be eliminated meaning that eight acts from each team will get through the live shows. The battle advisors for these episodes were: Christos Sumka working with Antonis Remos, Dimitris Kontopoulos working with Despina Vandi, Dimos Anastasiadis working with Michalis Kouinelis and Antonis Mitzelos working with Melina Aslanidou.

The Battles episodes started airing on Friday February 28, 2014 and will end on Friday March 21, 2014 after four episodes with eight battles taking place in each one.

Color key

Episode 1 (February 28) 
The first battle round episode was broadcast on February 28, 2014.

Episode 2 (March 7) 
The second battle round episode was broadcast on March 7, 2014.

Episode 3 (March 14) 
The third battle round episode was broadcast on March 14, 2014.

Episode 4 (March 21) 
The fourth and last battle round episode was broadcast on March 21, 2014.

Live shows

Results summary 
Color key
Artist's info

Result details

Live show details
The live shows took place in the Kapa Studios in Spata, Attica. Each coach has eight acts; during the first live show four from each team performed but only two of them advanced to the third live show. The same process goes on to the second with sixteen acts from both lives making it to the third live show. From the third live and on, each coach loses one act until each coach has one act in the final live.

The eight semi-finalists had a song written by songwriters and producers of Universal Greece. Even though the songs of the eliminated semi-finalists were not presented on the day of the results as it was done for the four finalists, they were included in the CD that was released in the newspaper Proto Thema. Apart from the eight songs of the semi-finalists, three of the duets performed in the semi-final were also included in the CD.

Color key

Week 1 (March 28) 
The first live show aired on March 28, 2014 – with four acts from each team performing. Two acts per team were saved, one by the public and one from his/her coach.
 Group performance: The Voice of Greece coaches – "Rixe Kokkino Sti Nihta" / "You're the Voice"

Week 2 (April 4) 
The live show aired on April 4, 2014 – with four acts from each team performing. Two acts per team were saved, one by the public and one from his/her coach.

Week 3 (April 11) 
The live show aired on April 11, 2014 – with four acts from each team performing. Three acts per team were saved, two by the public and one from his/her coach.

Week 4 (April 20) 
The live show aired on April 20, 2014 – with three acts from each team performing. Two acts per team were saved, one by the public and one from his/her coach.
 Group performances: Team Stavento ("Matia Mou Omorfa"), Team Vandi ("Hano Esena"), Team Remos ("Ta Savvata"), Team Aslanidou ("To Lathos")

Week 5: Semi-final (May 2) 
The live show aired on May 2, 2014 – with two acts from each team performing. One act per team was sent through the final by a mixed voting of the team's coach and public. Each artist performed two songs: a solo number and a duet with a guest. The four finalists performed a preview of their own songs after the results.
 Musical guests: Indila ("Dernière danse"), Stelios Rokkos ("Zo"), Vassilis Karras ("Prigkipessa"), Giorgia ("Ton Idio to Theo"), Mando ("Poliploka"), Elena Paparizou ("Don't Hold Back on Love"), Melisses ("Ena"), Kostas Makedonas ("Den Sou Aniko"), Manos Pirovolakis ("Den Anteho Na Min S'Eho")

Week 6: Final (May 9) 
The final live show aired on May 9, 2014 – with one artist from each team performing. Each artist performed three songs: a solo number, a duet with their coach and the song that was performed by the artist in the blind auditions.
 Group performance: The Voice of Greece Final 12 with Giorgos Liagas - "Love Me Again"

Performances by guests/coaches

Ratings

References

Season 1
Voice of Greece